Sportklub Niederösterreich St. Pölten, commonly known as simply SKN St. Pölten, is a basketball club based in Sankt Pölten, Austria. The club has won the Austrian championship six times, between 1993 and 1999. St. Pölten currently plays in the Superliga, the highest league in Austria.

In 2019, the club agreed with football club SKN St. Pölten to adopt its name and logo.

Names
Until 2005: UKJ SUBA Sankt Pölten
2005–2007: UKJ St. Pölten Haie
2007–2008: Sankt Pölten Basketball
2008–2012: UBC Sankt Pölten
2012–2017: Chin Min Dragons UBC Sankt Pölten
2017–2019: UBC Sankt Pölten
2019–present: SKN St. Pölten Basketball

Honours
Austrian Championship (6):
 1993, 1995, 1996, 1997, 1998, 1999
Austrian Basketball Cup (3):
 1994, 1996, 1998
Austrian Second League
Winners (1): 2015–16
Runners-up (2): 2014–15, 2016–17, 2018–19

Season by season

Players

Current roster

Notable former players
Either:
- Set a club record or won an individual award as a professional player.
- Played at least one official international match for his senior national team at any time.
  Philip Jalalpoor

References

External links
Team profile at eurobasket.com
Official website 

Basketball teams in Austria
Sankt Pölten
Basketball teams established in 1955